Animal machine or bête-machine (Fr., animal-machine), is a philosophical notion from Descartes in the 17th century who held that animal behaviour can be compared to the one of machines. Like them, animals would be an assembly of mechanical pieces and therefore unable to think and not gifted of consciousness, although they differ by their living character and ability of feeling. This implied a fundamental difference between animals and humans, but Man a Machine (L'homme Machine) by Julien Offray de La Mettrie, first published in 1747, extended Descartes' argument to humans.

This theory has been challenged from its original publication as inadequate to describe the specificities of life in animals and its ethical implications, while it has fed philosophical thought on the role of free will in human behaviour as opposed to determinism.

See also
 Mechanism (philosophy)
 Self-preservation

References

Philosophy of mind